Ali Ashraf Darvishian (‎; 25 August 1941 – 26 October 2017) was an Iranian story writer and scholar of Kurdish descent. After finishing teacher-training college, he would teach at the poverty-stricken villages of Gilan-e-Gharb and Shah Abad (nowadays called Islam Abad). This atmosphere is featured in most of his stories. His own life situation, as well as the experiences that he had from his teaching in those poor areas, was the inspiration for his literary works and also made him a critic of the political and social situation of Iran. Later, he moved to Tehran and continued his studies in Persian literature.

In 2006, Ali Ashraf Darvishian was in Australia as a guest of the Iranian Centre for Democracy and presented a number of lectures on a broad range of social and cultural issues.

Marjane Satrapi, an Iranian-French author, mentions Darvishian in her graphic novel Persepolis. She considers him her favorite childhood author, recalls going to his clandestine book signing, and describes him as "a kind of local Charles Dickens".

He died at Karaj, on 26 October 2017 and was buried at Behesht-e Sakineh cemetery.

Books
 آبشوران : مجموعة قصصية فارسية (Abshooran (Story collection)), 1975 
Salhay-e-Abri (Cloudy Years), 1997 novel.
Farhang-e-Afsanehay-e Irani (Iranian Legends and Fairy Tales Encyclopedia)
 Short Story: Paper Wishes, 2003

One of his books is a collection of short stories titled "Az Nadarad Ta Darad". Nadarad (Doesn't have) is one of the titles of the book. It is named after the family name of the main character of the story, which foreshadows the absolute poverty of all the characters in the story and mostly Nadarad (meaning Doesn't have) family. From the point of view of Marxist critical approach, one of the many perspectives through which a literary work can be analyzed, poverty can be said to have been the result of social conflict and class struggle, because people were not aware of how they have unconsciously accepted the subservient, powerless roles in their society that have been prescribed for them by others (false consciousness). In this story, Nadarad family is the representative of the proletariat, while Mash Ghorban represents the bourgeoisie. Niaz Ali, a child of a family, chooses to go to school in order to promote his class in society, and he has no plan of protesting against the cruel social structure.

References 

 about his book (in Persian)

External links 
 Cloudy Years Novel preview
 هندوانه‌ی گرم ـ علی‌اشرف درویشیان (in Persian)
 Ali Ashraf Darvishian, IMDb
 مصاحبه با علی اشرف درویشیان، نویسنده (in Persian)
 Ali Ashraf Darvishian's Biography, ABC Radio National
 List of the Author's works at Goodreads
 Payvand: Short Story: Paper Wishes

1941 births
2017 deaths
Iranian writers
People from Kermanshah
Iranian Kurdish people
Iranian male short story writers
Respiratory disease deaths in Iran
Kurdish Marxists
Kurdish socialists
Kurdish communists
Members of the National Council for Peace
Iranian Writers Association members
20th-century Iranian people
21st-century Iranian people
Iranian schoolteachers